The canton of Vervins is an administrative division in northern France. At the French canton reorganisation which came into effect in March 2015, the canton was expanded from 24 to 66 communes:
 
Archon
Les Autels
Autreppes
Bancigny
Berlise
La Bouteille
Braye-en-Thiérache
Brunehamel
Buironfosse
Burelles
La Capelle
Chaourse
Chéry-lès-Rozoy
Clairfontaine
Clermont-les-Fermes
Cuiry-lès-Iviers
Dagny-Lambercy
Dizy-le-Gros
Dohis
Dolignon
Englancourt
Erloy
Étréaupont
La Flamengrie
Fontaine-lès-Vervins
Fontenelle
Froidestrées
Gercy
Gergny
Grandrieux
Gronard
Harcigny
Hary
Haution
Houry
Laigny
Landouzy-la-Cour
Lerzy
Lislet
Luzoir
Montcornet
Montloué
Morgny-en-Thiérache
Nampcelles-la-Cour
Noircourt
Papleux
Parfondeval
Plomion
Prisces
Raillimont
Renneval
Résigny
Rocquigny
Rouvroy-sur-Serre
Rozoy-sur-Serre
Saint-Algis
Sainte-Geneviève
Soize
Sommeron
Sorbais
Thenailles
Le Thuel
Vervins  
Vigneux-Hocquet
La Ville-aux-Bois-lès-Dizy
Vincy-Reuil-et-Magny

Demographics

See also
Cantons of the Aisne department 
Communes of France

References

Cantons of Aisne